"Love Drunk" is the lead single from American pop rock band Boys Like Girls' second studio album of the same name (2009). It is their second highest charting single to date, peaking at number 22 on the Billboard Hot 100. It was first released in the US on June 30, 2009 through Sony Music.

Song information
The song premiered on MySpace and was released via iTunes on June 30, 2009. The single was sent to mainstream radio in the United States on July 7, 2009.

Reception
"Love Drunk" gained mixed reviews on its release. Some critics enjoyed the track, including About.com's Top 40 Reviews, which claimed the song had "glorious" elements. However, many critics and fans alike criticized the song's "unmistakeable" similarity to The Killers' single "Somebody Told Me", which features a chorus similar to the chorus from "Love Drunk".

Music video
The music video began shooting on June 29, 2009, and features actress and singer Ashley Tisdale. "Ashley was awesome -- she played the lead girl," Martin Johnson says. "We did this faux arcade set-up with the band as [carnival] guys. She makes all the guys in the arcade fall for her and then it has a surprise ending."

The music video was set for an August 3 release date on MTV, but was available to watch on YouTube and other video streaming sites prior to that date. It was directed by Travis Kopach.

Charts

End-of-year charts

References

2009 singles
Boys Like Girls songs
Songs written by Sam Hollander
Songs written by Dave Katz
Songs written by Martin Johnson (musician)
2009 songs
Sony Music singles